2-Naphthol, or β-naphthol, is a fluorescent colorless (or occasionally yellow) crystalline solid with the formula C10H7OH. It is an isomer of 1-naphthol, differing by the location of the hydroxyl group on the naphthalene ring. The naphthols are naphthalene homologues of phenol, but more reactive. Both isomers are soluble in simple alcohols, ethers, and chloroform. 2-Naphthol is a widely used intermediate for the production of dyes and other compounds.

Production
Traditionally, 2-naphthol is produced by a two-step process that begins with the sulfonation of naphthalene in sulfuric acid:
C10H8  +  H2SO4   →   C10H7SO3H  +  H2O
The sulfonic acid group is then cleaved in molten sodium hydroxide:
C10H7(SO3H)  + 3 NaOH   →   C10H7ONa  +  Na2SO3  +  2 H2O
Neutralization of the product with acid gives 2-naphthol.

2-Naphthol can also be produced by a method analogous to the cumene process.

2-Naphthol-derived dyes
The Sudan dyes are popular dyes noted for being soluble in organic solvents.  Several of the Sudan dyes are derived from 2-naphthol by coupling with diazonium salts.  Sudan dyes I–IV and Sudan Red G consist of arylazo-substituted naphthols.

Reactions
Some reactions of 2-naphthol are explicable with reference to its tautomerism, which produces a small amount of the keto tautomer.

One consequence of this tautomerism is the Bucherer reaction, the ammonolysis of 2-naphthol to give 2-aminonaphthalene.

2-Naphthol can be oxidatively coupled to form BINOL, a C2-symmetric ligand popularized for use in asymmetric catalysis.  

2-Naphthol converts to 2-naphthalenethiol by reaction with dimethylthiocarbamoyl chloride via the Newman–Kwart rearrangement. The OH→Br conversion has been described.

Electrophilic attack occurs characteristically at the 1-position as indicated by nitrosylation bromination, and alkylations. Ring-opening reactions have been documented.

Safety
Naphthols (both the 1- and 2- isomers) are used as biomarkers for livestock and humans exposed to polycyclic aromatic hydrocarbons.

References

External links 
 NIST Chemistry WebBook 2-Naphthalenol

 
2-Naphthyl compounds